Benjamin Werndl (born 20 July 1984) is a German dressage rider. Werndl competed at the 2022 World Championships in Herning, where he won a bronze medal with the German team and became 4th in the individual Freestyle final. Werndl also competed at the 2019 World Cup Finals in Gothenburg, where he finished 12th in the finals.

Benjamin Werndl is the brother of Jessica von Bredow-Werndl, who won double gold at the 2020 Olympic Games in Tokyo. Together they run a dressage stable Aubenhausen in Germany.

References

Living people
1984 births
German dressage riders
German male equestrians